This is a list of regions of Algeria by Human Development Index as of 2021.

References 

Algeria
Human Development Index
Regions by Human Development Index
Regions